Bethuel Muzeu (born 2 February 2000), also known as Muzeu Muzeu, is a Namibian footballer who plays for National First Division club Black Leopards and the Namibia national team.

Club career
Muzeu represented his native Omaheke Region in the 2018 Namibian Newspaper Cup. By the 2021 Namibia Premier Football League season, he joined Tura Magic. As a member of Kasaona FA he was the top scorer of the 2022 Ramblers-Bank Windhoek U21 tournament staged at Ramblers Stadium in Windhoek. The team went on to win the inaugural tournament.

In July 2022 Muzeu joined Black Leopards F.C. of the South African National First Division after impressing at the 2022 COSAFA Cup. The contract was for one season with an option for an additional season if the club earns promotion to the South African Premier Division. After playing in pre-season matches with the club, head coach Joel Masutha compared Muzeu to fellow-Namibian in South Africa Peter Shalulile.

International career
Muzeu represented Namibia at the youth level in 2019 Africa U-20 Cup of Nations qualification. He scored in the 1–1 second-leg draw with Botswana. However, Namibia was eliminated on away goals. He was named to Bobby Samaria's provisional squad ahead of 2023 Africa Cup of Nations qualification matches against Burundi and Kenya. In July 2022 Muzeu was named to Namibia's final roster for the 2022 COSAFA Cup by Collin Benjamin. He made his senior international debut on 12 July 2022 in the team's opening match, leading the offensive corps in a 2–0 victory against Madagascar. In Namibia's next match of the tournament, he scored the match-winning goal against Mozambique to send the nation to its fourth-ever COSAFA Cup final.

International goals
Last updated 15 July 2022.

International career statistics

References

External links

2000 births
Namibian men's footballers
Namibia international footballers
Living people
Association football forwards
Namibia youth international footballers
Tura Magic F.C. players
Namibian expatriate footballers
Namibian expatriate sportspeople in South Africa
Black Leopards F.C. players
Expatriate soccer players in South Africa
People from Omaheke Region